Aetna, Tennessee may refer to several places:
Aetna, Hickman County, Tennessee
Aetna, Marion County, Tennessee